Following is a list of multimedia franchises originating in games, toys, and merchandise.

In the following tables, the initial media through which the franchise characters or settings became known is shown in boldface. Only works of fiction are considered part of the series; a book or a documentary film about the franchise is not itself an installment in the franchise.

Franchises originating in video games

Including film and/or television works

Not including film and/or television works

Franchises originating in board games, card games, tabletop games and role-playing games

Franchises originating in toys, attractions and other media

See also 
 List of fictional shared universes in film and television – many multimedia franchises are based in fictional universes
 List of public domain works with multimedia adaptations
 List of highest-grossing media franchises
 Media mix

References 

Lists of multimedia franchises
Toy franchises